Qeinar (also known as Kenyār, Keynar, Kinār, and Qeinar kandi) is a village in Bonab Rural District, in the Central District of Marand County, East Azerbaijan Province, Iran. At the 2006 census, its population was 435, in 101 families.

References

External links 
 

 

Populated places in Marand County